Shohola may refer to:

Shohola Creek, a tributary of the Delaware River in the Poconos of eastern Pennsylvania
Shohola Falls, a 2003 novel written by Michael Pearson
Shohola Township, Pike County, Pennsylvania
Shohola train wreck, occurred on July 15, 1864